The 1st Combat Evaluation Group (initially "1CEG", later "1CEVG") was a Strategic Air Command (SAC) unit. It was formed on 1 August 1961 to merge the 3908th Strategic Standardization Group for SAC aircrew evaluation with the 1st Radar Bomb Scoring Group that had originated from the 263rd Army Air Force Base Unit which transferred from 15th AF to directly under Strategic Air Command .  The 1CEVG formed after SAC switched to low-level tactics to counter Soviet surface-to-air missiles ("Oil Burner" training routes in 1959) and SAC had "developed a Radar Bomb Scoring field kit for use in NIKE Systems" in early 1960 for scoring SAC training missions against US Hercules SAM sites. The 1CEVG headquarters included an Office of History and a "standardization and evaluation school" for command examiners.

Standardization and evaluation
The 1CEVG deputy commander for standardization and evaluation was responsible for performance assessment of SAC tanker and bomber flight crews. 1CEVG also evaluated the RC-135 units at Eielson, Kadena, and Offutt, the flight crew standardization of the U-2, the DC-130 reconnaissance drone program, CH-3 helicopter drone recovery program, [and] the SR-71 program at Beale AFB.

The Fairchild Trophy was Strategic Air Command's top Bombardment Award, for which the Group administered flight checks and evaluated standardization and training activities.

Divisions
1CEVG included a Command Instrument Flight Division and an RBS Division with 3 squadrons.

Radar Bomb Scoring Division
The Radar Bomb Scoring Division controlled the group's Radar Bomb Scoring units. As with the preceding 1st Radar Bomb Scoring Group at Carswell AFB, the division had 3 Radar Bomb Scoring Squadrons (10th, 11th, 12th) with RBS detachments at fixed radar stations and at semi-mobile radar stations (Mobile Duty Locations (MDLs)). The MDLs were set up for SAC special missions, with their equipment, trailers, books, etc., stored at Barksdale AFB when not in use. Each squadron manned an RBS Express train, but the squadrons were inactivated in 1966 after Vietnam War deployments had begun. The three squadrons in 1959 had 29 AUTOTRACK sites. 1CEVG temporary duty personnel at Nike Defense Areas also scored mock SAC raids tracked by the Army.

RBS trains were inactivated later in the war after the 1968-9 Project 693 discharging 1st term SAC airmen up to 11 months early. The division included a maintenance office. After the Vietnam War ended, the annual Combat Skyspot trophy was awarded for the outstanding RBS detachment (e.g., Louis Blotner Radar Bomb Scoring Site (Ashland Det 7) in 1985).

The squadrons initially used Matador Automatic Radar Control (AN/MSQ-1) and AN/MSQ-2 automatic tracking radar/computer systems.  The Reeves AN/MSQ-35 Bomb Scoring Central was developed for the division (mid-1963 testing was at the White Sands Missile Range.) During the Vietnam War, the Statesboro Bomb Scoring Site used a Soviet T2A for training crews to jam the signal. Three US bombing systems developed during the war (AN/MSQ-77, AN/TSQ-81, & AN/TSQ-96) were used post-war in the United States by the RBS Division, which replaced them with the  solid-state US Dynamics AN/TPQ-43 Bomb Scoring Set (SEEK SCORE) developed from the AN/TPB-1C Course Directing Central.

The Electronic Systems Division 806L "Range Threat" systems for electronic warfare simulation were developed for use by 1CEVG late in the Cold War. Such systems included the US Dynamics AN/MST-T1 Miniature-Multiple Threat Emitter Simulator (MUTES), for which the group evaluated the prototype in 1977 (operational in October 1978).  Similarly, TLQ-11 jammer improvements were in 1978, and in 1979 1CEVG members completed a prototype study and testing of the new Threat Reaction Analysis Indicator System (TRAINS) for analyzing how aircrews and avionics reacted to ground-based threats.

At the end of the Cold War, most RBS detachments were closed. The personnel and the assets of the RBS Division became the 1st Electronic Combat Range Group on 1 July 1989 when the 1CEVG was split, and other 1CEVG organizations transferred to SAC headquarters.

Stations

Detachments 7 & 50

Detachment 7, 1 CEVG was a Matagorda Island Air Force Base radar site for the "Busy Skyspot" training program for automatic tracking radar crews to use the Reeves AN/MSQ-77 Bomb Directing Central before transferring to Vietnam War operating locations.  A CONUS AN/MSQ-77 had initially been used at the mountainous Nellis Air Force Range before being moved to the Gulf Coast of the United States, then the detachment moved to Bergstrom Air Force Base and was redesignated Det 50 for long range tracking of bombers on 2 Matagorda Island Air Force Range routes (low- and high-level).  On 29 February 1968, on the low-level Matagorda route a Boeing B-52 Stratofortress crashed into the Gulf of Mexico.

Detachment 15

Detachment 15, 1CEVG at the Vietnam War's Tan Son Nhut Air Base served as an "administrative link between [the operating locations] and Headquarters 1st Combat Evaluation Group" after Reeves AN/MSQ-77 Bomb Directing Centrals were produced and deployed in 1965 for Combat Skyspot bomber operations by tactical fighter, B-52, and other units.  On 5 June 1966 near Đông Hà Combat Base close to the DMZ, six 1CEVG technicians were killed while conducting a preliminary site location survey.

Lineage
Constituted as the 3903d Radar Bomb Scoring Group from the 3903d RBS Squadron (at Carswell AFB beginning 24 Feb 48) and predecessor 263rd AAF Base Unit
 Redesignated 1st Radar Bomb Scoring Group on 10 August 1954
 Merged with the 3958 Opl Evaluation & Tng Gp for the B-58 on 15 Mar 60
 Redesignated 1st Combat Evaluation Group at Carswell AFB prior to 21 July 1961 for the merger of the Barksdale AFB 3908th Strategic Standardization Group and 1st RBS Group
 Redesignated 1st Electronic Combat Range Group on 1 July 1989 from the assets and personnel of the Radar Bomb Scoring Division, 1CEVG

Squadrons
 10th Radar Bomb Scoring Squadron, 10 August 1954 – 19 September 1966
 11th Radar Bomb Scoring Squadron, 10 August 1954 – 22 August 1966, March AFB, California
 12th Radar Bomb Scoring Squadron, 10 August 1954 – 25 July 1966, Turner AFB, Georgia
 13th Radar Bomb Scoring Squadron, 10 August 1954 – unknown, Ellisville, MS

Commanders
 Col. Joseph D. White, 1 Aug 1961 – 20 May 1964
 Col. Melvin R. Schultz, 20 May 1964 – 16 May 1966
 
 Col. Willie H. Sontag, 1 Feb 1970 – 1 Jul 1971
 Col. Alvin E. Prothero, 1 Jul 1971 – 25 Apr 1975
 Col. Edward F. Gehrke, 25 Apr 1975 – 27 Oct 1978
 
 Col. Larry S. DeVall, 1 Dec 1979 - 16 Sept 1981
 Col. John R. Rader, 16 Sept 1981 - 28 Jul 1983
 Col. Billy F. Price, 28 Jul 1983 – 15 Jan 1988
 Col. John C. Dalton, 16 Jan 1988 – 23 Jan 1989
 Col. Joseph M. Hudson, Jr., 23 Jan 1989 – ?

References

001
1961 establishments in the United States
1989 disestablishments in the United States
Military units and formations established in 1961
Military units and formations disestablished in 1989
Units and formations of Strategic Air Command